The Mine That Bird Derby (formerly the Borderland Derby) is an American Thoroughbred horse race held at Sunland Park Racetrack in Sunland Park, New Mexico. Named originally for the location of the track, which sits on the border of New Mexico and Texas, the race is a prep for the Sunland Derby (formerly the WinStar Derby), which is on the road to the Kentucky Derby. The Mine That Bird Derby is for three-year-olds and is run at the distance of 1-1/16 mi.

Winners of the Mine That Bird / Borderland Derby

References
Sunland Park Racetrack and Casino Media Guide 2015-2016 edition

Ungraded stakes races in the United States
Horse races in New Mexico
Flat horse races for three-year-olds
Triple Crown Prep Races
Sports in New Mexico
2001 establishments in New Mexico
Recurring sporting events established in 2001
Sports competitions in New Mexico